Ivo Facundo Chaves (born 30 June 1993) is an Argentine professional footballer who plays as a midfielder for Gimnasia y Tiro.

Career
Chaves started his career with Gimnasia y Tiro in 2012. He scored goals in Torneo Argentino A against Talleres and Alumni in his debut season of 2011–12, prior to netting six times in fifty-one appearances across the following two campaigns. On 1 July 2014, Chaves joined Torneo Federal A's Talleres. Ten goals in seventy appearances followed in three seasons as Talleres won consecutive promotions to the Argentine Primera División. He made his top-flight bow against Colón on 16 September 2016. In August 2017, Chaves was loaned to San Martín. However, he returned months later without featuring.

January 2018 saw Chaves leave on loan again, joining former club Gimnasia y Tiro in Torneo Federal A on loan. He terminated his contract with Talleres in September 2018, following issues with chronic fatigue and hypogonadism. Ahead of January 2020, Chaves made a return to football with Gimnasia y Tiro. He scored one goal in two matches for the Torneo Regional Federal Amateur club, prior to the division's curtailment due to the COVID-19 pandemic.

Career statistics
.

Honours
Talleres
Primera B Nacional: 2016

References

External links

1993 births
Living people
People from Salta
Argentine footballers
Association football midfielders
Torneo Argentino A players
Torneo Federal A players
Primera Nacional players
Argentine Primera División players
Gimnasia y Tiro footballers
Talleres de Córdoba footballers
San Martín de Tucumán footballers
Sportspeople from Salta Province